A bronze statue of Christian Peter Wilhelm Beuth by August Kiss is installed at Schinkelplatz in Berlin, Germany.

References

External links

 

Bronze sculptures in Germany
Monuments and memorials in Germany
Outdoor sculptures in Berlin
Sculptures of men in Germany
Statues in Germany
Mitte